Isabel Valley is a valley in the Diablo Range in Santa Clara County, California. It is also known as Santa Ysabel Valley.

History
Isabel Valley was used by the Five Joaquins Gang of Joaquin Murrieta to hold stolen horses until they could be driven southward on the La Vereda del Monte.

References

External links 
Map of Isabel Valley

Valleys of Santa Clara County, California
La Vereda del Monte